Safe Working Load (SWL) sometimes stated as the Normal Working Load (NWL) is the maximum safe force that a piece of lifting equipment, lifting device or accessory can exert to lift, suspend, or lower, a given mass without fear of breaking.  Usually marked on the equipment by the manufacturer. It is a calculation of the Minimum Breaking Strength (MBS) also known as Minimum Breaking Load (MBL) divided by a safety factor, usually ranging from 4 to 6 on lifting equipment. The factor can be as high as 10:1 or 10 to 1, if the equipment poses a risk to a person's life.  

Working Load Limit (WLL) is the maximum working load designed by the manufacturer. This load represents a force that is much less than that required to make the lifting equipment fail or yield. The WLL is calculated by dividing MBL by a safety factor (SF). An example of this would be a chain that has a MBL of 2000 lbf (8.89 kN) would have a SWL or WLL of 400 lbf (1.78 kN) if a safety factor of 5 (5:1, 5 to 1, or 1/5) is used.

The current American standard for lifting and handling devices is Reference (1), which provides minimum structural and mechanical design and electrical component selection criteria for ASME B30.20 below-the-hook lifting devices. The provisions in this Standard apply to the design or modification of below-the-hook lifting devices.  

As such:

WLL = MBL / SF

SWL is no longer used to identify the maximum capacity of equipment due to it being too vague and leaving it open for legal issues. The US and European standards switched to The Working Load Limit' standard shortly after.

References

Safety engineering

1) ASME BTH-1 (Below the Hook Lifting Devices)